Empress Wang Muzhi (王穆之) (died 22 February 365), formally Empress Aijing (哀靖皇后, literally "the lamentable and peaceful empress") was an empress of the Eastern Jin dynasty.  Her husband was Emperor Ai.

Wang Muzhi's father Wang Meng (王濛) was at one time the chief assistant to a prime minister, but it is not clear which prime minister he served.  She became Emperor Ai's wife while he was still the Prince of Langye during the reign of his cousin Emperor Mu, and she carried the title of Princess of Langye.  After he became emperor in July 361 following Emperor Mu's death, he created her empress on 29 October 361.  She did not bear any children, and died in February 365. Emperor Mu would die in the following month, from complications of poisoning he suffered by taking pills given him by magicians in search of immortality.  They were buried together with imperial honors.

References 

365 deaths
Jin dynasty (266–420) empresses
4th-century Chinese women
4th-century Chinese people
Year of birth unknown